The following list of Université du Québec à Montréal people includes notable administrators, alumni and faculty of Université du Québec à Montréal.

Rectors
The following is a list of rectors of Université du Québec à Montréal.

Notable faculty

 François Barbeau
Francine Descarries
Andrée-Anne Dupuis-Bourret
Karen Messing

Notable alumni

A
David Altmejd
Nelly Arcan
Maxime Arseneau
François Avard
Paulina Ayala

B
Misstress Barbara
Manon Barbeau
Marie-France Bazzo
Steven Bednarski
Louis Bélanger
Germain Belzile
Stéphane Bergeron
Daniel Bernard
Maxime Bernier
Sylvie Bernier
Guy Berthiaume
Marguerite Blais
Valérie Blass
Steven Blaney
Diana Boulay
Pierre Breton
Pierre-Luc Brillant

C
Martin Camirand
Bonnie Campbell
Guy Caron
Jocelyne Caron
Benoit Charette
Denis Chouinard
Christy Chung
Marie Cinq-Mars
Philippe Comtois
Jacques Cossette-Trudel
Jacques Côté
Claude Cousineau
François Croteau

D
Michel de Broin
François Desrochers
Ann Dow
Patrick Doyon
Emmanuel Dubourg
Maryse Dubuc
Benoît Dutrizac

F
Joseph Facal
Luc Ferrandez
Raymonde Folco

G
Elodie Ghedin
Marie Gibeau
Alain Giguère
Greg N. Gregoriou
Jasmin Guénette

H
Émilie Heymans
Denise Ho (dropped out)
Danny La Puta Huang

I
Mustapha Ishak Boushaki

J
Marlene Jennings
Peter Julian

L
Arthur Lamothe
Louise Lanctôt
Christian Langlois
Daniel Langlois
Marquise Lepage
Éric Laporte
Jean-Claude Lauzon
Jeanne Leblanc
Josée Legault
Guy Lelièvre
Martin Lemay
Guy A. Lepage

M
Pierre Marsan
Scott McKay
Ariane Moffatt
Sylvie Moreau
Marie-Claude Morin

N
Louise Nadeau
Janice Nadeau

P
Daniel Paillé
Marc Parent
Pierre Karl Péladeau
Bryan Perro
Luc Picard
Patrick Pichette
Carole Poirier
Léa Pool
Sébastien Proulx

R
André Ristic
Gilles Robert
Régine Robin

S
Romeo Saganash
Jean-Claude St-André
Caroline St-Hilaire
Ken Scott
Jean-François Simard
Jennifer Stoddart
Hugues Sweeney

T
Shelley Tepperman
Tony Tomassi

U
Marie Uguay

V
Jean-Marc Vallée
Michel Venne
Antoine Vézina
Yolande Villemaire
Martin Villeneuve

W
Laure Waridel

References

people
Quebec a Montreal, Universite du
Universite du Quebec a Montreal